Dwight Edward Ewell (born 1968) is an American actor known for his roles in films such as Chasing Amy, Amateur, Party Girl and The Guru.

Career
Ewell was born in Williamston, North Carolina to teenage parents. His father fought in Vietnam and served six years in the United States military while Dwight's mother took care of Dwight and his younger sister. Unhappy in her marriage, at 21 years old, Dwight's mom took the children up North where she felt that she could begin pursuing her career as a singer. The three moved several times before ending up in the rough Stella Wright Housing Projects on Prince Street, in Newark, New Jersey. Dwight and his sister attended the Louise A. Spencer Elementary School in Newark in the mid-1970s. In later years, Dwight was enrolled in The Gifted and Talented Program in the same school. It was there that his interest in the arts was nurtured. At the age of 9, he began writing plays that the teachers would allow him to direct and the students to perform. At the age of 13, Ewell auditioned for and was accepted into Arts High School in Newark, New Jersey. In 1986, he graduated, and in the fall of that year he attended the State University of New York's Theater Arts and Film Divisions Acting Program for four years.

Ewell has worked extensively in independent and art house films. Ewell is best known for his performance in Kevin Smith's Chasing Amy starring Ben Affleck, where he plays the role of "Hooper X", an African American writer of black militant comic books, who is secretly homosexual but employs the public persona of a violent militant who denounces the Star Wars trilogy as racist.

Ewell has collaborated with director Hal Hartley on short- and feature-length films; including Amateur and Flirt.

He has also worked with director Daisy von Scherler Mayer twice, in the films Party Girl and The Guru.

Ewell has worked with film producer Christine Vachon twice, on the films Stonewall and Kiss Me, Guido.

Filmography

References

External links

Dwight Ewell at Viewaskew.com
Dwight Ewell Filmography

1968 births
Living people
American male film actors
African-American male actors
Male actors from North Carolina
State University of New York at Purchase alumni
People from Williamston, North Carolina
21st-century African-American people
20th-century African-American people